Apothecary  is a 2014 Indian Malayalam-language medical thriller film directed by Madhav Ramadasan, and produced by George Mathew and Baby Mathew under the banner of Arambankudiyil Cinemas. The film stars Suresh Gopi, Jayasurya, Asif Ali, Abhirami (after a hiatus of 10 years), Meera Nandan and Indrans.

The film received Special Jury Mention in 45th Kerala State Film Awards for Indrans and producer Dr. George Mathew.

Plot
Dr. Vijay Nambiar is a skilled and renowned neurosurgeon. He lives with his wife, Dr. Nalini and their two children. Both the doctors work at Apothecary Hospital. The film begins with Nambiar's being admitted to the hospital because of a motor vehicle accident. He has suffered a brain injury, and his chance of survival seems slim. Subin Joseph, a patient of Nambiar's, comes to visit him.

Subin recounts his experience at the hospital under Nambiar's care. The hospital is revealed to be run greedily, with patients being subjected to expensive and unnecessary tests and medicines. Nambiar is a doctor with a good reputation, but is forced by the management to run clinical trials for new drugs. He realizes that such trials are necessary for progress, but the lack of ethical protocol and the side effects of such drugs turn the patients' lives into a living hell.

This dilemma consumes him, causing him to have hallucinations of his clinical trial patients. His soul is locked in a surreal struggle between the good and the bad actions of his work. His accident resulted from such an episode, wherein he fell to the road in a fit of panic. Finally, he is redeemed with the realization that his work has saved thousands, compared to the few lives destroyed by his actions. Should he live, he would go on to save even more lives.

Nambiar returns to life a changed man. He confronts the hospital board about their actions. He reminds them of the definition of 'Apothecary' which was used years back, to refer to doctors who treated village folk with their medicines. Stating that the hospital simply retains that name, he leaves the hospital to set up a charitable institution. Nalini and several of the hospital staff and patients accompany him on his new journey.

Cast

 Suresh Gopi as Dr. Vijay Nambiar
 Jayasurya as Subin Joseph
 Asif Ali as Prathapan
 Arun as Dr. Raheem
 Abhirami as Dr.Nalini Nambiar, wife of Dr. Vijay
 Meera Nandan as Daisy, lover of Subin
 Raghavan Nair as Dr. Shankar Vasudev
 Indrans as Joseph, father of Subin
 Kavitha Nair as Sabira Usman
 Thampy Antony as Dr. Ali Ahamed
 Neeraj Madhav as Shinoy Joseph, brother of Subin
 Lishoy as Dr. Peethambaran
 Malavika as Meenu
 Jayaraj Warrier as Varkkichan
 Seema G. Nair as Clara, mother of Subin
 Jayan Cherthala as Sajan Xavier
 Mohanakrishnan as Hameed
 Dr. George Mathew as Dr. Mathew Koshi
 Shivakumar as Dr. MK Nambiar, father of Dr. Vijay
 Preman as Meenu's father
 Sajad Brite as Usman, husband of Sabira
 Neeraja as Dr. Nimisha
 Saniya Iyappan
 Bindu Krishna as Dr. Maria

Reception 
Paresh C Palicha of Rediff movies praised Suresh Gopi's performance and noted that the film could have been better. Nicy, V.P. of International Business Times, wrote that Apothecary is a must watch. She also praised performance of Jayasurya.

Awards and honours

References

External links 
 

2010s Malayalam-language films
2014 films